Dieudo Hamadi (born 1984) is a documentary filmmaker from the Democratic Republic of the Congo.

Born in Kisangani, he was a teenager when the Six-Day War broke out in the region.

His first short documentary film, Ladies in Waiting (Dames en attente), won the Pierre et Yolande Perrault Grant for an emerging filmmaker at the Cinéma du Réel film festival in 2010. The film was part of Congo in Four Acts, an anthology of four short films by emerging Congolese filmmakers.

In 2013 his film Town Criers (Atalaku) won the festival's Joris Ivens Prize for Best First Film. In 2014 he won the festival's Potemkine and Société civile des auteurs multimédia awards for National Diploma (Examen d'état), and in 2017 he won the festival's Grand Prize for Mama Colonel.

In 2018, his film Kinshasa Makambo won the Tim Hetherington Award at the 2018 Sheffield DocFest, and the True Vision Award at the 2018 True/False Film Festival.

His 2020 film Downstream to Kinshasa (En route pour le milliard) was named an Official Selection of the 2020 Cannes Film Festival, the first film from the Democratic Republic of the Congo ever designated. Due to the cancellation of the festival in light of the COVID-19 pandemic in France, it was not screened at that time; however, it was given an online screening for distributors as part of the Marché du Film. It had its public premiere in September 2020 as part of the Planet Africa program at the 2020 Toronto International Film Festival, where it received an honorable mention from the jury for the Amplify Voices Award.

Filmography
Ladies in Waiting (Dames en attente) - 2010
Town Criers (Atalaku) - 2013
National Diploma (Examen d'état) - 2014
Mama Colonel (Maman Colonelle) - 2017
Kinshasa Makambo - 2018
Downstream to Kinshasa (En route pour le milliard) - 2020

References

External links

Democratic Republic of the Congo documentary filmmakers
Living people
Democratic Republic of the Congo film producers
1984 births